This article lists events from the year 2009 in France.

Incumbents
 President – Nicolas Sarkozy
 Prime Minister – François Fillon

Events

January
29 January – Strike action by French public sector workers causes major disruption to services.

February
 General strikes in Guadeloupe and Martinique.
 At the beginning of February: A conflict ignites the French universities concerning the statute of the searchers-teachers. Many voices claim moreover the abrogation of law LRU on the autonomy of the universities. The second half of the universities' year is very disrupted.

March
 20 March : Child abduction of 3-year-old Franco-Russian girl Elise, by her Russian mother in Arles (Bouches du Rhône).
 29 March : Referendum on the departmentalization of island of Mayotte. The result is "Yes" with a crushing majority. Mayotte island will become the 101st French départment.

April
 April : Do Not Look at the Sun literary magazine is launched.
 3 and 4 April :  Summit of NATO in Strasbourg. France joined the integrated command of NATO, a decision which is far from making unanimity in the French political community. During the summit, large incidents occur in certain districts of Strasbourg.
 15 April : Coming into effect of the new plates of registrations on the new vehicles. New classification is allotted to life for each vehicle and comprises two letters, an indent, three digits, an indent and two letters. A number of department to the choice as well as the logo of the corresponding area is affixed on the line.

May
 1 May : France's health minister confirms the first cases of swine flu detected within the country.

June
 1 June : Air France Flight 447, a scheduled flight from Rio de Janeiro to Paris, crashes into the Atlantic Ocean , killing all 228 people on board.
 9 June : European Election.

July
 9 July : Youths protest in Firminy near Saint-Étienne, after an Algerian man, Mohamed Benmouna, dies in police custody. His parents reject the official verdict of suicide.
 14 July : Bastille Day riots take place in a suburb of Paris. In the commune of Montreuil, Seine-Saint-Denis, an eastern suburb area of Paris, youths set fire to 317 cars, and thirteen police officers are injured. 
 26 July : The 2009 Tour de France concludes in Paris. Alberto Contador of Spain is the overall winner.

August

September
27 September – The 2009 Jeux de la Francophonie open in Beirut, Lebanon.

October
27 October – The 2009 French Super Series badminton competition opens in Paris.

November
9 November – Socialist politician Jack Lang, appointed by President Nicolas Sarkozy as special envoy to North Korea, travels to Pyongyang for a "listening mission".
20 November – Air France makes its first commercial flight of the Airbus A380

December

Births
 6 April - Valentina Tronel, singer and winner of the Junior Eurovision Song Contest 2020
 7 March – Prince Umberto of Savoy
 19 November – Prince Gaston of Orléans (2009–)

Deaths

January
1 : Laurence Pernoud, writer
6 : Jean-Pierre Bakrim, soccer player
7 : Roger Besse, politician
8 : Gaston Lenôtre, pastry chef
10 : Georges Cravenne, producer, "César Award" creator
12 : Claude Berri, producer and filmmaker
14 : Nicolas Genka, writer
15 : René Coll, orchestra driver
22 : Marcel Schneider, writer
25 : Gérard Blanc, singer

February
26 : Paul Germain, scientist

March
2 : Alexandre Léontieff, French Polynesia president until 1991
14 : Alain Bashung, singer
29 : Maurice Jarre, composer

April
14 : Maurice Druon, writer

May
20 : Lucy Gordon, British actress

June
6 : Jean Dausset, immunologist

July
6 : Mathieu Montcourt, tennis player

August
22 : Adrien Zeller, politician

September
6 : Sim, actor, comedian, writer
12 : Willy Ronis, photographer

October
14 : Francis Muguet, scientist

November
17 : José Aboulker, member of anti-Nazi resistance
19 : Daul Kim, South Korean model

References

Links

2000s in France